Kopnino is a rural locality (a village) in Kopninskoye Rural Settlement, Sobinsky District, Vladimir Oblast, Russia. The population was 134 as of 2010. There are 4 streets.

Geography 
Kopnino is located 27 km southwest of Sobinka (the district's administrative centre) by road. Fedotovo is the nearest rural locality.

References 

Rural localities in Sobinsky District